Wendel Archibald Robertson (7 May 1894 – 3 November 1963) was an American pursuit pilot and a flying ace in World War I.

Biography
Born in Guthrie, Oklahoma,  he joined the Air Service, United States Army in 1917 during World War I.  After pilot training in the United States, Lieutenant Robertson was assigned to the 139th Aero Squadron, 2d Pursuit Group, First Army Air Service.   In combat over the Western Front in France, Lieutenant Robertson was credited with shares in seven victories.

He attended Yale University and graduated on June 23, 1915 (Bachelors of Art)

He died on 3 November 1963 and was buried at Fort Smith, Arkansas.

See also

 List of World War I flying aces from the United States

References

1894 births
1963 deaths
American World War I flying aces
United States Army officers